Alan Landsburg Productions (ALP) was an independent television production company founded by Alan Landsburg in 1971. The company had produced In Search of... and That's Incredible!, two early examples of reality television decades before it became a confirmed genre. The company also found success in television movies (the Emmy-winning Mickey Rooney film Bill), and scripted shows (the sitcoms Gimme a Break! and Kate and Allie). They made a few theatrical movies as well, most notably Jaws 3-D (1983).

The company was acquired in 1978 by Reeves Communications Corp.  In 1984, Landsburg left the company and formed The Landsburg Company, in partnership with Cox Enterprises, and ALP was renamed the Reeves Entertainment Group. David Auberbach, a friend of Lansburg served as vice president, received a new deal at the studio. Barris Industries originally owned a 5.27% stake in Reeves, with backing from Burt Sugarman. In 1987, the company had signed a partnership with independent television producer Blue Andre to an exclusive first-look agreement, to develop projects like The Warriors, which was based on a 1985 Pulitzer Prize play winner by William Broad, which was sold to CBS as a two-hour made-for-television movie, and The Secret of Sherwood Forest, which was also was done for CBS. It was purchased by Thames Television in 1990 for $89 million. The rights to the company's library is now owned by Fremantle. Distribution rights in the United States vary on an individual basis.

Productions

Alan Landsburg Productions
In Search of... (1976–1982)
Highcliffe Manor (1979)
That's Incredible! (1980–1984)
Those Amazing Animals (1980–1981)
The Jayne Mansfield Story (1980 TV-movie)
The Krypton Factor (1981 TV game show) (in association with MCA Television Enterprises)
Bill (1981 TV movie)
Gimme a Break! (1981–1984) (Reeves Entertainment 1984–1987)
Adam (1983 TV movie) and its sequel Adam: His Song Continues (1986)
Baby Makes Five (1983)
The Pop 'N Rocker Game (1983–1984 TV game show)
Kennedy (1983 TV miniseries)
Kate & Allie (1984–1989) (Reeves Entertainment 1984–1985)
The Kids From C.A.P.E.R.  (1976–1977)

Reeves Entertainment
I Married Dora (1987–1988)
The Home Show (1988–1994)
Doctor Doctor (1989–1991)
Jackpot! (1989–1990)
Wild & Crazy Kids (1990–1992)
What Would You Do? (1991–1993)
The Tomorrow People (1992–1995)
Homicide: Life on the Street (1993–1999) (first season only)

See also
 Reeves Teletape Studios

References

External links 
 Mini Profile

Landsburg Productions, Alan
RTL Group
Former Bertelsmann subsidiaries